Everyone Says Hello is a BBC Audiobooks original audiobook written by Dan Abnett and based on the British science fiction television, Doctor Who spin-off series Torchwood. It was released on 4 February 2008.

Plot summary
Early in the morning, Owen Harper is summoned to work by Jack. On his way to work, he is greeted by both the milkman and the postman – each introduce themselves by saying "hello" and by telling Owen all about their life: their name, their relations, likes/dislikes etc. He brushes them off, despite them still trying to talk to him, calling "hello" as he leaves. As Gwen Cooper arrives in Mermaid Quay, she is greeted by a tourist in much the same way.

When they all arrive, Jack Harkness tells them of a problem; a powerful energy field that came through the Rift. When questioned by Owen and Gwen as to whether it is related to the peculiar behaviour they had seen that morning, Jack is doubtful and claims that what they witnessed was just common courtesy. The energy source is transmitting on the PK scale allowing Gwen to correctly guess the next card in a pile, 5 times out of 5, when tested by Owen.

The entire city is grinding to a halt as people are more interested in saying "hello" than doing their jobs, resulting in absolute mayhem. Vic Royce, a large, short-tempered ex-convict, has an out-of character, polite conversation with a middle-aged woman before driving off with a smile on his face.

Vic Royce and a trucker named Alan Kennedy enter a garage in a disused lot. Inside is a pulsing light and two other people. They all introduce themselves to the light, and the light greets them in return.

Phone usage in Cardiff is up by nearly 100% with people calling each other simply to say "hello" leading Jack to retract his previous diagnosis about the overly friendly people encountered by Owen and Gwen. Jack theorizes that the PK field may be being created by a reconnaissance probe, sent to gather information for an inquisitive species. Jack's plan involves Owen, Gwen and himself using scanners to track down the energy source on foot and shut it down whilst Ianto Jones and Toshiko Sato stay at the Hub. The entire team are provided with metal cuffs that block the PK energy from infiltrating their minds.

There are now six people in the abandoned garage surrounding the light. The light explains that their minds are particularly receptive to the energy field and that they are designated as "Heralds." It will be they who will act as conduits of knowledge between mankind and the light – providing information and giving messages to mankind when the time was right. The light reveals to the Heralds that the rest of its plan cannot unfold until the intruders it detects have been dealt with.

Tosh and Ianto are probing the area they suspect the source to be, but when they get close, their computer systems go into meltdown and all crash. The Heralds, relieved that the initial breach has been halted, take up mêlée weapons and prepare for further attacks.

Areas of the city are burning, unchecked, due to irons and hobs left unattended and people who are yet to be indoctrinated are attacking the people who surround them out of fear. A nearby gas leak ignites, causing an explosion which knocks out Jack's wrist device, leaving him susceptible to indoctrination. Despite the system crash, Tosh has managed to narrow down the location of the energy source. She relays this information to the rest of the team.

Featuring
Jack Harkness
Gwen Cooper
Owen Harper
Toshiko Sato
Ianto Jones

Continuity
Sarcastically, Jack reminds the team that they work for Torchwood, telling them it is "separate from the government, outside the police, beyond the United Nations." This reflects the opening monologue from each episode of the main series, which is, in turn, dialogue lifted from the episode "Everything Changes."

Outside references
Owen thinks to himself that "to say he wasn't a morning person was like saying Dr. Crippen wasn't a model husband."
Bob Geldof, Martin Scorsese, Countdown, Dick Francis, the Playboy Channel, Diarmuid Gavin, the Cutty Sark are all mentioned by the greeters.
Surrounded by the zombie-like hordes, a shopping mall security guard is reminded of a zombie film he once saw, referencing Dawn of the Dead.
A discarded mobile phone's ringtone plays the "Colonel Bogey March."

Publication
Everyone Says Hello shares similar themes to Dan Abnett's original Torchwood novel, "Border Princes," namely intelligence gathering and youth violence.

References

Audiobooks based on Torchwood
Works by Dan Abnett